Houleye Ba (born July 17, 1992) is a Mauritanian middle-distance runner. 

She competed at the 2016 Summer Olympics in the women's 800 metres race; her time of 2:43.52 in the heats did not qualify her for the semifinals. At the 2020 Summer Games she ran in the 100 metres and ran a time of 15.26 which was a personal best.

References

1992 births
Living people
Mauritanian female middle-distance runners
Olympic athletes of Mauritania
Athletes (track and field) at the 2016 Summer Olympics
Athletes (track and field) at the 2020 Summer Olympics